Armbro Dallas (1982–2001) was a standardbred millionaire and world record setting racehorse who competed in harness racing in Canada and the United States. He was trained, driven and co-owned by Canadian and U.S. Hall of Fame inductee, Ron Waples. 

Armbro Dallas is best remembered for beating Nihilator and Forest Skipper in the 1985 running of the Pilgrim Pace at Garden State Park Racetrack in New Jersey. Both Nihilator in 1985 and Forest Skipper in 1986 went on to win Harness Horse of the Year honors.

On November 21, 1985 Armbro Dallas set a new world record for gelded pacers with a win  at Garden State Park in a time of 1:52 3/5.

Armbro Dallas died at age 19 at the farm of co-owner Ron Waples.

References

1982 racehorse births
2001 racehorse deaths
Canadian Standardbred racehorses